The Regional Council of Martinique was the regional council for Martinique.
In 2015, the new Assembly of Martinique was created to replace both the Regional and General Councils of Martinique.

It was headquartered in the hotel district of Defferre Cluny, Fort-de-France. The Regional council was chaired by Serge Letchimy of the Martinican Progressive Party from the 21 of March 2010 until its replacement by the Assembly of Martinique.

Executive and Standing Committee
1st Vice President: Catherine Conconne, 
2nd Vice President: Jean-Claude Duverger (PPM), 
3rd Vice President: Patricia This,
4th Vice President: Didier Laguerre,
5th Vice President: Yvette Galot,
6th Vice President: Luke Clemente-Louison, 
7th Vice President: Jenny Dulys, 
8th Vice President: Justin Pamphile,
9th Vice President: Jocelyne Pinville, 
10th Vice President: Daniel Robin, 
11th Vice President: Daniel Marie-Sainte, 
12th Vice President: Miguel Laventure.

Political parties
Majority:
"Together for a new Martinique" (PPM alliance, the Socialist Federation of Martinique, Franciscan Popular Movement, Dare Dare, Miscellaneous Left Movement "Living in Schoelcher" and civil society), led by Serge Letchimy has 26 seats.
 
The 26 elected officials are: Serge Letchimy (PPM), Catherine Conconne (PPM), Jean-Claude Duverger (PPM), Patricia This (WSF), Didier Laguerre (PPM), Yvette Galot (DVG), Luc-Louison Clemente (Living Movement Schoelcher), Jenny Dulys (Dare Dare), Justin Pamphile (DVG), Jocelyne Pinville (DVG), Daniel Robin (PPM), Karine Roy-Camille (civil society), Daniel Chomet (PPM), Christiane Mage (PPM), Simon Morin (PPM), Marie-France Thodiard (MPF), Jean Crusol (PPM), Maria Theresa Casimirius (PPM), Fred Lordinot (PPM), Marlene Lanoix (WSF), Camille Chauvet (PPM), Karine Galy (DVG) Jose Maurice (DVG), Elizabeth Landi (PPM), Thierry Fondelot (PPM), Manuela Kéclard-Mondesir (PPM).

Opposition:
"Martinique Patriots and Sympathizers" (MIM alliance, Palima, CNCP, Sympathizers), led by Alfred Marie-Jeanne has 12 seats.

Committees
Committee for Sustainable Development, Transport and Energy: Chairperson-Daniel Chomet
Committee for Economic Affairs: Chairperson-Jean Crusol
Committee for Social Economy: Chairperson-Justin Pamphile
Committee for Culture and Heritage: Chairperson-Yvette Galot
Committee for Construction and Equipment: Chairperson-Luc-Louison Clemente
Committee for Finance and The Budget: Chairperson-Fred Lordinot
Committee for Agriculture and Livestock: Chairperson-Jose Maurice
Committee for Cooperation and European Affairs: Chairperson-Karine Galy
Committee for Fisheries, Aquaculture, Marine resources and Maritime affairs: Chairperson-Maurice Antiste
Committee for Education and Training: Chairperson-Daniel Robin
Committee for Higher Education, Innovation and Research: Chairperson-Elizabeth Landi
Committee for Health: Chairperson-Marlene Lanoix
Committee for Housing and Habitation: Chairperson-Simon Morin
Committee for Sports: Chairperson-Thierry Fondelot
Committee for Legal Affairs, Opinion and Statutory texts and the legislature: Chairperson-Chantal Maignan
Committee for the Currency: Chairperson-Didier Laguerre
Committee for Evaluation of the SAR: Chairperson-Camille Chauvet
Committee for Public Private Partnership: Chairperson-Didier Laguerre
Special Committee for Project management: Chairperson-Manuella Kéclard-Mondesir
Committee for Public Service: Chairperson-Daniel Robin
Committee for the Stimulus plan and Major Infrastructural projects: Chairperson-Catherine Conconne
Committee for Community Preparedness: Chairperson-Didier Laguerre
Committee for Early Planning: Chairperson-Justin Pamphile
Committee for Tourism: Chairperson-Karine Roy-Camille
Committee for Evaluation: Chairperson-Daniel Robin
Committee for Dock Fees and taxes: Chairperson-Andre Lesueur
Committee for Major risks and natural disasters: Chairperson-Jocelyne Pinville

See also
 List of presidents of the Regional Council of Martinique

Government of Martinique
Former legislatures of Overseas France